Yeoford is a village near the town of Crediton in Devon, England. It is served by Yeoford railway station on the Exeter to Barnstaple railway line, otherwise known as the Tarka Line.

Primary school
Yeoford Community Primary School was opened in 1878. The school has four mixed-age classes at present. In January 2012 it formed The Woodleigh Federation with Tedburn St Mary and Cheriton Bishop Primary schools. The aim was to ensure the long term viability of these relatively small rural village schools along with improving inter school links for the benefit of all the pupils.

Local authority
Yeoford is located within Mid Devon local authority area. Historically, it formed part of Crediton Hundred. It falls within Crediton/Sandford Deanery for ecclesiastical purposes.

References

External links
 http://www.yeoford.devon.sch.uk/

Villages in Devon